The 2021 Ladbrokes Masters was the ninth staging of the non-ranking Masters darts tournament, held by the Professional Darts Corporation (PDC). It was held from 29 to 31 January 2021, behind closed doors at the Marshall Arena in Milton Keynes, England.

Peter Wright was the defending champion, after beating Michael Smith 11–10 in the 2020 final, but he lost 11–10 to Jonny Clayton in the semi-finals.

In its first major change since its inception in 2013, the field was increased from 16 to 24 players, with the top 8 players entering at the second round.

Jonny Clayton won his first individual televised title, beating Mervyn King 11–8 in the final, and by winning the tournament, he also secured his place in the 2021 Premier League, which he won. Clayton's winning run included a victory over Michael van Gerwen, which ended the so-called "van Gerwen curse", whereby any player who knocked out van Gerwen in a PDC major would subsequently lose in the next round.

The final itself was notable, as if the usual format of 16 players had been maintained, neither of the two finalists would have qualified for the tournament.

Qualifiers
The Masters featured the top 24 players in the PDC Order of Merit after the 2021 PDC World Darts Championship, with the top 8 automatically qualifying for the second round. Dimitri Van den Bergh, Glen Durrant, Krzysztof Ratajski, José de Sousa, Jeffrey de Zwaan and Chris Dobey made their debuts in the event.

The following 24 players took part in the tournament:

Prize money
The prize money was £220,000 in total, an increase of £20,000 from 2020 to incorporate the extra 8 players.

Draw

References

Masters
Masters (darts)
Masters (darts)
Masters (darts)
Sport in Milton Keynes
2020s in Buckinghamshire